Richard Eells (1800–1846) was an abolitionist and physician from Illinois. Born in Connecticut, he immigrated to Quincy, Illinois in 1833. A Yale College graduate, he set up a medical practice and quickly involved himself in abolitionism. His house became known as a place of refuge for escaped slaves.

On August 21, 1842, an escaped slave known only as Charley, owned by Chauncey Durkee of Monticello, Missouri came to the house seeking help and transport. A freedman, Barryman Barnett had spotted Charley, swimming across the Mississippi and directed him to Eells’ house.  Dr. Eells attempted to hide Charley in his carriage and drive across town to where a safer hiding place awaited. However, a posse of slave catchers tried to intercept them. Charley was returned to Durkee who requested that Eells be charged with “harboring and secreting a fugitive slave”, a crime in the Illinois Criminal Code of the time. 

County Circuit Judge, Stephen A. Douglas fined Eells $400. He appealed the ruling to the Illinois Supreme Court in 1844 where he lost again.

In the meantime, the celebrated case brought Eells to the attention of the wider abolitionist movement. He was made president of the Illinois Anti-Slavery Party in 1843 and selected as the Liberty Party’s candidate in the 1844 presidential election. He unsuccessfully ran for governor of Illinois in 1846.  However, the costly legal proceedings undermined Eell’s finances and health. Exhausted and ill, he died on a river boat on the Ohio River near Cincinnati in 1846.

Nevertheless, Eells’ estate continued the appeal process up to the US Supreme Court. Here, abolitionist senators, Salmon P. Chase and William H. Seward made the case for Eells’ innocence. Despite the heavy weight of this defense team, the Supreme Court was unwilling to challenge the national status quo then sympathetic to slave owners. Eells’ conviction for “harboring and secreting a fugitive slave” was upheld in 1852.
In 2015, Quincy Mayor Chuck Shultz sought a posthumous pardon for Dr. Eells and it was finally granted by Governor Pat Quinn. Dr. Eells house in the South Side German Historic District of Quincy has been restored and is open to the public.

Notes

Further reading
 Alvins, Alfred. “The Right to Be a Witness and the Fourteenth Amendment.” Missouri Law Review (Fall, 1966). pp. 471–504.
 Hull, Kent, “Dr. Richard Eells Goes to Court”, Herald Whig, (January 24, 2021).
 McGinley, Patrick, “Eells House Connects Town with Underground Railroad”, Herald Whig, (September 11, 2011).
 Muelder, Hermann R. Fighters for Freedom: The History of Anti-Slavery Activities of Men and Women Associated with Knox College (Columbia Univ. Press. 1959). 
 Snodgrass, Mary Ellen. The Underground Railroad: An Encyclopedia of People, Places and Operations (Routledge. 2015).

External links
 Dr. Richard Eells House: Dr. Richard Eells House from National Park Service

Quincy, Illinois
19th-century American slaves
Freedom suits in the United States
United States slavery case law
1800 births
1846 deaths
American abolitionists
Liberty Party (United States, 1840) politicians